Richardis of Schwerin (1347 – April 23 or July 11, 1377) was Queen of Sweden as the consort of King Albert.

Life
Richardis was the child of Otto I, Count of Schwerin (d. 1357) and Matilda of Mecklenburg-Werle (d. 1361) and the paternal niece of Richardis of Schwerin, Duchess of Schleswig, the wife of the former Valdemar III of Denmark. She was engaged to Albert of Mecklenburg, who was also to be king of Sweden.

In Wismar on 12 October 1352, the marriage contract was signed. It was not until 1365, however, that they were married in person and Richardis arrived in Sweden. She died in Stockholm and was buried in the Cloister Church at the Black Friars' Monastery.

Children 
Eric I, Duke of Mecklenburg (1365–1397); also called Duke Eric, heir to the throne of Sweden and Lord of Gotland.
Richardis Catherine of Sweden (1370/1372-1400); married John of Görlitz

References 

  Wilhelmina Stålberg: Anteqningar om svenska qvinnor (Notes on Swedish women) (Swedish)
 Åke Ohlmarks: Alla Sveriges drottningar (All the queens of Sweden) (Swedish)

|-

|-

Richardis
1347 births
1377 deaths
House of Hagen
14th-century Swedish people
14th-century Swedish women